The Freight House is a restaurant in downtown La Crosse, Wisconsin located close to the river front and Riverside Park. The building was a freight house built by the Chicago, Milwaukee and St. Paul Railway in 1880, with an addition in 1904. It was converted in 1978 into a restaurant. It is on the National Register of Historic Places.

See also
La Crosse Commercial Historic District (located two blocks south of the Freight House)
Hixon House

References

National Register of Historic Places in La Crosse County, Wisconsin
Buildings and structures in La Crosse County, Wisconsin
Railway buildings and structures on the National Register of Historic Places in Wisconsin
Individually listed contributing properties to historic districts on the National Register in Wisconsin